James Maceda (born January 18, 1949) is a retired journalist, who was a foreign correspondent for NBC News based in London. He was with NBC for nearly 35 years before retiring in early 2015.

References

External links
NBC's bio of Jim Maceda

Living people
1949 births
American television journalists
American war correspondents
American male journalists
People from West Covina, California